Clint de Ganon is an American drummer and percussionist from Hastings-on-Hudson, New York.  Clint has played in many Broadway hits including Hairspray and Footloose - writing the drum score for both. He was also the drummer for the movie adaption of Hairspray. Currently, Clint can be found at the Stephen Sondheim Theatre where he is the drummer for the smash hit Broadway musical Beautiful.

Clint has performed and/or recorded with various artists including: Stevie Wonder, Kiki Ebsen, Hiram Bullock, John Tropea, Art Garfunkel and many more.

References

Living people
American percussionists
People from Hastings, New York
1958 births
20th-century American drummers
American male drummers
20th-century American male musicians